Anhovo (Anicova Corada before 1927) is a settlement on the right bank of the Soča River in the Municipality of Kanal ob Soči in the Littoral region of Slovenia. It is best known for its cement factory, Salonit Anhovo, built in 1921.

There is a small railway station on the outskirts of the settlement.

References

External links

Anhovo on Geopedia
Anhovo on the Kanal Tourist Information site

Populated places in the Municipality of Kanal
Populated places in the Soča Valley